Dudi Sela and Jimmy Wang were the defending champions, but decided not to compete.

Tomasz Bednarek and Adil Shamasdin won the title, defeating Gero Kretschmer and Michael Venus in the final, 7–5, 6–7(5–7), [10–8]

Seeds

Draw

Draw

References
 Main Draw

Open Guadeloupe - Doubles
2014 Doubles